Hustad is a former municipality in Møre og Romsdal county, Norway. Hustad existed as a municipality from 1918 until its dissolution in 1964 when it was merged into Fræna Municipality.  The  municipality encompassed most of the northern part of the Romsdal Peninsula in what is now Hustadvika Municipality.  The administrative centre of the municipality was the village of Hustad where Hustad Church is located.

History

The municipality of Hustad was established on 1 July 1918 when the larger Bud Municipality was divided into two separate municipalities: Bud (population: 1,397) in the west and Hustad (population: 2,062) in the east.

During the 1960s, there were many municipal mergers across Norway due to the work of the Schei Committee. On 1 January 1964, there was a merger involving Hustad Municipality (population: 2,196) in the north, Bud Municipality (population: 1,610) in the west, and Fræna Municipality (population: 3,430) in the south, forming a new, larger Fræna Municipality.

Government
All municipalities in Norway, including Hustad, are responsible for primary education (through 10th grade), outpatient health services, senior citizen services, unemployment and other social services, zoning, economic development, and municipal roads.  The municipality is governed by a municipal council of elected representatives, which in turn elects a mayor.

Municipal council
The municipal council  of Hustad was made up of 17 representatives that were elected to four year terms.  The party breakdown of the final municipal council was as follows:

See also
List of former municipalities of Norway

References

Hustadvika (municipality)
Former municipalities of Norway
1918 establishments in Norway
1964 disestablishments in Norway